Ulick Burke, 1st Viscount Galway (– 1691) was an Irish army officer slain at the Battle of Aughrim while fighting for the Jacobites during the Williamite War in Ireland.

Birth and origins 

Ulick was born about 1670 a younger son of William Burke and hisy his second wife, Helen MacCarty. His father was the 7th Earl of Clanricarde.

Ulick's mother was his father's second wife. She was a daughter of Donough MacCarty, 1st Earl of Clancarty, and therefore belonged to the MacCarthy of Muskerry dynasty, a Gaelic Irish family that descended from the kings of Desmond.

Ulick was one of four siblings, who are listed in his father's article. He also had half-siblings from his father's first marriage, who are also listed in his father's article.

His father was succeeded by his half-brothers Richard and John as the 8th and the 9th Earl.

Ulick was the brother-in-law of Jacobite leader Patrick Sarsfield, who married Ulick's sister, Honora Burke.

Viscount Galway 
He was created by letters patent dated 2 June 1687 Baron of Tyaquin and Viscount Galway. This was the second creation of the latter title.

Marriage and child 
In 1688 Galway, as he was now, married a daughter of George Lane, 1st Viscount Lanesborough, by his second wife Frances, daughter of Richard Sackville, 5th Earl of Dorset. His wife's name is given either as Elizabeth or as Frances. Ulick's wife remarried to Henry Fox after his death and died in 1713.

 
According to sources, the marriage was either childless, or Ulick and Elizabeth had a daughter who some sources say died in infancy. Others identify her as the Elizabeth Burke, that is described by Turtle Bunbury as a "celebrated poetess", who later married Sir Thomas Blake, 7th Baronet of Menlo, son of Sir Walter Blake, 6th Baronet of Menlo and Anne Kirwan. They had at least a daughter, Anne, and a son, Sir Ulick Blake, 8th Baronet of Menlo.

James II in Ireland and the Williamite war 

Galway took mhis seat at the Lords during the Patriot Parliament in 1689. Following the start of Protestant resistance to the Catholic James II, Galway raised a regiment of foot in Connaught to serve in the Irish Army. Viscount Galway served actively during the war, and was killed along with many senior Jacobite officers at the 1691 Battle of Aughrim.

The Galway title was subsequently made into an earldom and awarded to Henri de Massue, a French Huguenot commander in the Williamite forces.

Arms

Notes and references

Notes

Citations

Sources 

 
  – Jim Burke!
 
 
  – G to K (for Viscount Galway)
  – Canonteign to Cutts (for Clanricarde)
 
  – Irish stem

Further reading 
Wauchope, Piers. Patrick Sarsfield and the Williamite War. Irish Academic Press, 1992.

1670 births
1691 deaths
House of Burgh
17th-century Irish people
Irish Jacobites
Irish soldiers in the army of James II of England
Irish soldiers
Members of the Irish House of Lords
Peers of Ireland created by James II
People from County Galway
Viscounts in the Peerage of Ireland
Younger sons of earls